Athanasios Xarchas (born 1931) is a Greek lawyer and politician.

Biography 
He was born in 1931 in Palamas, Domokos. He studied law in the University of Athens.

He was elected member of parliament of Phthiotis with New Democracy from 1981 to 1993, while he served as minister of trade from April 1990 until August 1991, as part of the Mitsotakis government.

References 

People from Domokos
1931 births
Living people
Greek MPs 1981–1985
Greek MPs 1985–1989
Greek MPs 1989 (June–November)
Greek MPs 1989–1990
Greek MPs 1990–1993
National and Kapodistrian University of Athens alumni